Bjarne Iversen (2 October 1912 – 7 September 1999) was a Norwegian cross-country skier who competed in the 1930s. He won a silver medal in the 4 × 10 km relay at the 1936 Winter Olympics in Garmisch-Partenkirchen.

Iversen also won a silver medal in the 4 × 10 km relay at the 1935 FIS Nordic World Ski Championship and had his best individual finish of sixth in the 18 km event at those same games.

Cross-country skiing results
All results are sourced from the International Ski Federation (FIS).

Olympic Games
 1 medal – (1 silver)

World Championships
 1 medal – (1 silver)

References

External links
 
 

Norwegian male cross-country skiers
Olympic cross-country skiers of Norway
Olympic silver medalists for Norway
Cross-country skiers at the 1936 Winter Olympics
1912 births
1999 deaths
Olympic medalists in cross-country skiing
FIS Nordic World Ski Championships medalists in cross-country skiing
Medalists at the 1936 Winter Olympics
20th-century Norwegian people